Scedella orientalis is a species of tephritid or fruit flies in the genus Scedella of the family Tephritidae.

Distribution
Sri Lanka, Vietnam, Indonesia, Australia.

References

Tephritinae
Insects described in 1908
Diptera of Asia